The 2016 budget can refer to:

 2016 United States federal budget
 2016 United Kingdom budget
 2016 Union budget of India